George Leslie Condon (6 July 1906 – 7 July 1976) was an  Australian rules footballer who played with South Melbourne in the Victorian Football League (VFL).

Notes

External links 

1906 births
1976 deaths
Australian rules footballers from Victoria (Australia)
Sydney Swans players